Hydrogen fuel refers to hydrogen which is burned as fuel with oxygen. It is zero-carbon, provided that it is created in a process that does not involve carbon. It can be used in fuel cells or internal combustion engines (see HICEV). Regarding hydrogen vehicles, hydrogen has begun to be used in commercial fuel cell vehicles such as passenger cars, and has been used in fuel cell buses for many years. It is also used as a fuel for spacecraft propulsion and is being proposed for hydrogen-powered aircraft.

Production

Because pure hydrogen does not occur naturally on Earth in large quantities, it usually requires a primary energy input to be produced on an industrial scale. Hydrogen fuel can be produced from methane or by electrolysis of water. As of 2020, the majority of hydrogen (∼95%) is produced from fossil fuels by steam reforming or partial oxidation of methane and coal gasification with only a small quantity by other routes such as biomass gasification or electrolysis of water.

Steam–methane reforming, the current leading technology for producing hydrogen in large quantities, extracts hydrogen from methane. However, this reaction releases fossil carbon dioxide and carbon monoxide into the atmosphere, which are greenhouse gases exogenous to the natural carbon cycle, and thus contribute to climate change. In electrolysis, electricity is run through water to separate the hydrogen and oxygen. This method can use wind, solar, geothermal, hydro, fossil fuels, biomass, nuclear, and many other energy sources. Obtaining hydrogen from this process is being studied as a viable way to produce domestically at a low cost. Researchers are also developing artificial leaves which integrate light absorbers with catalysts and can produce hydrogen directly from water. While this technology is still at an early stage, floating farms of lightweight devices may potentially supply remote communities.

The world's largest facility for producing hydrogen fuel is claimed to be the Fukushima Hydrogen Energy Research Field (FH2R), a 10 MW-class hydrogen production unit, inaugurated in March 2020, in Namie, Fukushima Prefecture. The site occupies  of land, much of which is occupied by a solar array; power from the grid is also used for electrolysis of water to produce hydrogen fuel.

Production is usually classed in terms of colour labels; 'grey hydrogen' is produced as a by-product of an industrial process, 'blue hydrogen' is produced through a production process where  is also produced then subsequently captured via CCS, and finally 'green hydrogen' is produced entirely from renewable sources.

Energy
Hydrogen is found in the first group and the first period in the periodic table, i.e., it is the lightest element. Hydrogen is rarely found in its pure form in the atmosphere, H2. In flame of pure hydrogen burning in air, the hydrogen (H2) reacts with oxygen (O2) to form water (H2O) with the release of energy.

2H2 (g) + O2 (g) → 2H2O (g) + energy

In atmospheric air rather than pure oxygen, hydrogen combustion may yield a small amount of nitrogen oxides with the water vapor. The energy released allows hydrogen to be used as a fuel. In an electrochemical cell, that energy can be used with relatively high efficiency. If the energy is used to produce heat, thermodynamics places limits on the thermal efficiency of the process.

Hydrogen is usually considered to be an energy carrier, like electricity, as it must be produced from a primary energy source such as solar energy, biomass, electrical energy (e.g. in the form of solar PV or via wind turbines), or hydrocarbons such as natural gas or coal. Conventional hydrogen production using natural gas induces significant environmental impacts; as with the use of any hydrocarbon, carbon dioxide is emitted. At the same time, the addition of 20% hydrogen (an optimal share that does not affect gas pipes and appliances) to natural gas can reduce  emissions from heating and cooking. Hydrogen is locked up in enormous quantities in water, hydrocarbons, and other organic matter.

One of the challenges of using hydrogen as a fuel comes from being able to extract hydrogen efficiently from these compounds.  Currently, steam reforming, which combines high-temperature steam with natural gas, accounts for the majority of the hydrogen produced. This method of hydrogen production occurs at 700–1100 °C, and has an efficiency of 60–75%. Hydrogen can also be produced from water through electrolysis, which is less carbon-intensive if the electricity used to drive the reaction does not come from fossil-fuel power plants but rather from renewable or nuclear energy sources. The efficiency of water electrolysis is about 70–80%, with a goal of 82–86% efficiency by 2030 using proton exchange membrane (PEM) electrolyzers.

Other methods for producing hydrogen for fuel are also currently being tested. Renewable liquid reforming is the process of taking liquid fuels, like ethanol, and reacting with high-temperature steam to produce hydrogen near the point of end use. In the presence of a catalyst, hydrogen, carbon monoxide and carbon dioxide are produced. The resulting carbon monoxide is reacted at high-temperatures with steam to produce more carbon dioxide and hydrogen in a "water-gas shift reaction". Then the hydrogen is separated and purified.  Another method is using starch-rich feedstocks to ferment to produce hydrogen. This is known as dark fermentation and uses anaerobic bacteria primarily to ferment mainly carbohydrates into hydrogen. Other processes are photoheterotrophic processes. In this process, a prokaryotic microorganism called pure non-sulfur bacteria (PNS) or green algae reacts with light to produce hydrogen, via a pathway of photosynthesis. Unlike dark fermentation, these processes use enzymes like hydrogenase and nitrogenase for generation of molecular hydrogen.

Currently, the breakdown of hydrogen gas production is mainly coming from fossil fuels. In fact, 96% of hydrogen is produced directly from fossil fuels, the majority of which coming from natural gas (48%). Only 4% of hydrogen is produced indirectly from fossil fuels by electrolysis with no breakdown in green hydrogen. 

Green hydrogen is any hydrogen that is produced from renewable energy. This includes electrolysis with electricity coming from green sources such as solar, wind, and hydroelectric power. Blue hydrogen is hydrogen that is produced from natural gas in advanced processes which emit greenhouse gas emissions. Grey hydrogen is produced from steam methane reforming, or steam reforming, which has a higher greenhouse gas emission total than blue hydrogen. Finally, brown hydrogen is produced from coal in Coal Classification which has one of the highest greenhouse gas emissions per ton of hydrogen produced. Thermochemical water splitting ins the newest source of green hydrogen production beyond hydrolysis. Using chlorine and sulfur, in the presence of a nuclear reactor, sunlight can be focused above a solar thermochemical hydrogen (STCH) reactor to produce hydrogen. 

Once produced, hydrogen can be used in much the same way as natural gas – it can be delivered to fuel cells to generate electricity and heat, used in a combined cycle gas turbine to produce larger quantities of centrally produced electricity or burned to run a combustion engine; all methods producing no carbon or methane emissions. In each case hydrogen is combined with oxygen to form water. This is also one of its most important advantages as hydrogen fuel is environmentally friendly. The heat in a hydrogen flame is a radiant emission from the newly formed water molecules. The water molecules are in an excited state on the initial formation and then transition to a ground state; the transition releasing thermal radiation. When burning in air, the temperature is roughly 2000 °C (the same as natural gas).

Historically, carbon compounds have been the most practical carriers of energy, as hydrogen and carbon combined are more volumetrically dense, although hydrogen itself has three times the specific energy (energy per unit mass) as methane or gasoline. Although hydrogen is the lightest element and thus has a slightly higher propensity to leak from older natural gas pipes such as those made from iron, leakage from plastic (polyethylene PE100) pipes is expected to be very low at about 0.001%.

The reason that steam–methane reforming has traditionally been favoured over electrolysis is that whereas methane reforming directly uses natural gas as a source of energy, electrolysis requires electrical energy for this. When the cost of producing electrical energy (via wind turbines and solar PV) falls below the cost of natural gas, electrolysis will become cheaper than SMR.

Before natural gas became generally available, in some cases tonnage hydrogen was produced for industry by water electrolysis, although not for use as a fuel. In a plant located at Risdon, Tasmania, Australia, designed to produce 60,963 tonne per annum of ammonium sulfate fertilizer, ammonia was synthesised by reacting nitrogen and hydrogen. The nitrogen was obtained by distilling liquid air and the hydrogen was made by electrolysing water. The design hydrogen production rate was 2,790 tonne per annum and the design ammonia production rate was 15,714 tonne per annum. Production commenced in late 1956 and the plant ran until 1986. Mercury arc rectifiers were used. Some ammonia production continued until 1993. The electricity for electrolysis was generated by hydro-electric power stations.

Uses

Hydrogen fuel can provide motive power for liquid-propellant rockets, cars, trucks, trains, boats and airplanes, portable fuel cell applications or stationary fuel cell applications, which can power an electric motor. Hydrogen is considered as the primary sustainable source of renewable energy and is "highly required for advanced energy conversion systems."

The problems of using hydrogen fuel in cars arise from hydrogen being difficult to store in either a high pressure tank or a cryogenic tank. Alternative storage media such as within complex metal hydrides are in development. In general, batteries are more suitable for vehicles the size of cars or smaller, but hydrogen may be better for larger vehicles such as heavy trucks, because hydrogen energy storage offers greater range and quicker refueling time.

Hydrogen fuel can also be used to power stationary power generation plants, or to provide an alternative to natural gas for heating.

Fuel cells

Fuel cells present the most attractive choice for energy conversion from hydrogen to electrical power, due to their high efficiency, low noise, and a limited number of moving parts. Fuel cells are of interest for both stationary and mobile power generation from hydrogen. Fuel cells are often considered as part of a vehicle propulsion system.

Using a fuel cell to power an electrified powertrain including a battery and an electric motor is two to three times more efficient than using a combustion engine, although some of this benefit is related to the electrified powertrain (i.e., including regenerative braking).  This means that significantly greater fuel economy is available using hydrogen in a fuel cell, compared to that of a hydrogen combustion engine.

Internal combustion engine conversions to hydrogen

Alongside mono-fuel hydrogen combustion, combustion engines in commercial vehicles have the potential to be converted to run on a hydrogen–diesel mix. This has been demonstrated in prototypes in the UK, where their  emissions have been reduced by up to 40% during normal driving conditions. This dual-fuel flexibility eliminates range anxiety as the vehicles can alternatively fill up only on diesel when no hydrogen refuelling is available. Relatively minor modifications are needed to the engines, as well as the addition of hydrogen tanks at a compression of 350 bars.

Trials are underway to test the efficiency of the 100% conversion of a Volvo FH16 heavy-duty truck to use only hydrogen. The range is expected to be 300 km/17 kg; which means an efficiency better than a standard diesel engine (where the embodied energy of 1 gallon of gasoline is equal to 1 kilogram of hydrogen).

Compared to conventional fuels, if a low price for hydrogen (€5/kg), significant fuel savings could be made via such a conversion in Europe or the UK. A lower price would be needed to compete with diesel/gasoline in the US, since these fuels are not taxed as much.

Combustion engines using hydrogen are of interest since the technology offers a less substantial change to the automotive industry, and potentially a lower up-front cost of the vehicle compared to fully electric or fuel cell alternatives. However, the non-zero emission nature of the engine means it will not be able to operate in city zero emission zones, unless part of a hybrid powertrain.

Drawbacks 
Hydrogen has a high energy content per unit mass. However, at room temperature and atmospheric pressure, it has a very low energy content per unit volume compared to liquid fuels or even to natural gas. For this reason, it is usually either compressed or liquefied by lowering its temperature to under 33 K. High-pressure tanks weigh much more than the hydrogen they can hold. For example in the 2014 Toyota Mirai, a full tank contains only 5.7% by weight of hydrogen, the rest of its mass being that of the tank.

Hydrogen fuel is hazardous because of its low ignition energy and high combustion energy, and because it tends to leak easily from tanks. Explosions at hydrogen filling stations have been reported. Hydrogen fueling stations, like petrol, generally receive deliveries of hydrogen by truck from hydrogen suppliers. Similar to all commodity distribution systems, an interruption at a supply facility can shut down multiple fueling stations.

See also
 Fuel cell vehicle
 HCNG
 Hydrogen compressor
 Hydrogen safety
 Hydrogen storage
 Hydrogen technologies
 Hydrogen transport
 Hydrogen vehicle
 Oxyhydrogen flame
 Photoelectrolysis of water
 Photocatalytic water splitting
 Synthetic fuel

References

Notes

Bibliography
 

 

 Hydrogen as the fuel of the future, report by the DLR

Fuels

Hydrogen technologies
Hydrogen economy
Industrial gases